Ajagbusi Ekun was a traditional ruler of Owo Kingdom, Ondo state, southwestern Nigeria. He succeeded Olowo Ojugbelu Arere, the first Olowo of Owo.

References

Yoruba monarchs
Nigerian traditional rulers
People from Owo
Olagbegi family